The  is a Japanese railway line in Niigata Prefecture that runs from Muikamachi in Minamiuonuma City to Saigata in Jōetsu City. However, the construction of the line was plagued by numerous delays, and was finally completed as a third sector line on 23 March 1997, including the  Akakura Tunnel, the longest on a non-JR line.

Unlike most other third sector company lines, the Hokuhoku Line made steady profits after its opening, as the former Hakutaka Limited Express train service, which travelled using the line, served as the principal link between the Tokyo metropolitan area and the Hokuriku region until the opening of the Hokuriku Shinkansen in 2015.

Services

Originally, the line acted as a connecting route to the Jōetsu Shinkansen at Echigo-Yuzawa Station. Upon the opening of the Hokuriku Shinkansen on 14 March 2015, the limited express services Hakutaka of the line, which had run from 1997 with an average daily ridership of 6,900 passengers, were withdrawn. Since then, a daily special rapid service Snow Rabbit has been served, instead of Hakutaka.

Trains from Muikamachi are described as down-bound, whereas those from Saigata are described as up-bound.

Local Service 
16 return trips are operating each day, including one up-bound through service from Arai of the Myōkōhaneuma Line. Some trains running on Sundays are designated as Yumezora, in which movies will be played when the trains are going through a tunnel. Since the discontinuation of Hakutaka in 2015, required trip time is reduced by 10 minutes. Through-trains to and from JR Lines do not stop at some stations of the Jōetsu Line and Shin'etsu Main Line.

Rapid Service 
Two down-bound and three up-bound trains are operating each day between Echigo-Yuzawa and Naoetsu.

Chō-Rapid Service - Snow Rabbit (スノーラビット) 
Two down-bound and one up-bound trains are operating each day, and one of the down-bound train runs through to Arai of the Myōkōhaneuma Line. The fastest service, which stops only at Tōkamachi, only takes 57 minutes travelling from Echigo-Yuzawa to Naoetsu.

Chō-Slow Service - Snow Turtle (スノータートル) 
Snow Turtle is a special service with irregular schedules and available for rental by organizations. Being a comical counterpart of Snow Rabbit, the trains run at a very low speed, as slow as 10 km/h, to give passengers a chance to experience winds while opening the side doors of the trains. Meals are also provided during the four-hour journey.

Passing loops
There are three passing loops on the Hokuhoku Line. Each has one bi-directional through track to allow full line speed.

Akakura
Between Uonumakyūryō and Misashima in Tōkamachi, Niigata. It is in the 10472m Akakura tunnel.

Yakushitōge
Between Tōkamachi and Matsudai in Tōkamachi, Niigata. It is in the 6199m Yakushitōge tunnel.

Gimyō
Between Matsudai and Hokuhoku-Ōshima in Tōkamachi, Niigata. It is in the 9130m Nabetachiyama tunnel(:ja:鍋立山トンネル).

Gallery

Rolling Stock
12 HK100 series - For Local, Rapid and Chō-Rapid
9 HK100-0 series train sets were built by Niigata Transys for use on local, rapid and Chō-Rapid Snow Rabbit trains between Echigo-Yuzawa and Naoetsu, and started operation since its opening in 1997. Having a maximum speed of 110 km/h operating on the 160 km/h lines, this trains feature a fast acceleration of 3.0 km/h/s to minimize disruptions of Hakutaka train services. 1 permanent 2-car sets known as HK100-100 series entered service in 2003, and 4 cars were refurbished for the Yumezora video projection train.

Former
681-2000 series - Hakutaka
683-8000 series - Hakutaka
18 cars of 681-2000 series and 9 cars of 683-8000 series trains, nicknamed Snow Rabbit Express (SRE) were built by Kawasaki Heavy Industries, with final assembly at Niigata Transys for operation on the Hakutaka limited express trains between Echigo-Yuzawa and Kanazawa stations. At a operating speed of 160 km/h, this was the fastest train in the country to run on narrow gauge. Following the retirement of the Hakutaka services, the trains were transferred to JR West for operation on Shirasagi limited express services.

Stations 
The Hokuhoku line is entirely in Niigata Prefecture.
 Service patterns: 
● All trains stop
○ Some trains stop
｜ All trains pass
＊ Seasonal stop
 Track:
∥: Double-track section
∧: Double-track section begins
∨: Double-track section ends
｜: Single-track section
◇: Passing loop

See also
List of railway companies in Japan
List of railway lines in Japan
Densha de Go! - a Japanese series of train simulation games, some of which featured the line
Shareholders
Niigata Prefecture - 54.8%
Joetsu, Niigata - 13.2%
Tokamachi, Niigata - 11.9%
Echigo Kotsu - 2.2%

References

This article also incorporates material from the corresponding article in the Japanese Wikipedia

External links 
  
  

Railway lines in Japan
Rail transport in Niigata Prefecture
1067 mm gauge railways in Japan
Railway lines opened in 1997
Japanese third-sector railway lines
1997 establishments in Japan